The 2011 Asian Archery Championships was the 17th edition of the event. It was held at the Azadi Sport Complex in Tehran, Iran from 20 to 24 October 2011 and was organized by Asian Archery Federation.

Medal summary

Recurve

Compound

Medal table

References

External links
 Official Website

Asian Championship
A
A
Asian Archery Championships
Archery competitions in Iran